Cult of the Dead is a 2008 album by thrash metal/death metal band Legion of the Damned. In common with previous albums, the lyrics heavily reference the dark side of the occult. The special edition comes with an item unique in metal merchandising (And possibly all genres of music), being a cheese block, emblazoned with their logo. This is a nod to the band's Dutch origins. The digipak version of the album features an alternative cover and comes with a DVD. The DVD has the same track listing as the CD, but then being played in their rehearsal place.

Track listing 
"Sermon of Sacrilege (Intro)" – 1:14
"Pray & Suffer" – 4:14
"Black Templar" – 3:20
"House of Possession" – 3:49
"Black Wings of Yog-Sothoth"  – 2:54
"Cult of the Dead" – 4:17
"Necrosophic Blessing" – 3:45
"Enslaver of Souls" – 4:06
"Solar Overlord" – 3:30
"Lucifer Saviour" – 3:41
"The Final Godsend" – 6:46

Personnel
Maurice Swinkels – vocals
Richard Ebisch – guitar
Harold Gielen – bass
Erik Fleuren – drums

External links
Official website
Legion of the Damned at Massacre Records

2008 albums
Legion of the Damned (band) albums
Massacre Records albums
Albums produced by Andy Classen